Iñaki Goitia Peña (born 2 March 1982) is a Spanish former footballer who played as a goalkeeper.

He spent most of his professional career in Segunda División, totalling 265 appearances for Málaga B, Málaga, Betis, Mirandés and Alavés. He added 29 La Liga matches over three seasons, in representation of the second and third clubs.

Club career
Goitia was born in Barakaldo, Biscay. After starting with modest clubs in the Basque region, he moved in 2003–04 to Málaga CF, spending his first two years with the B side in the Segunda División. In February 2006 he made two La Liga appearances, in two defeats in which he conceded seven goals; the season ended in relegation, while the reserves also dropped down a tier.

In 2007–08, Goitia finally won the battle for first-choice status over longtime incumbent Francesc Arnau, appearing in 41 out of 42 games as the Andalusians returned to the top flight after two years. The following campaign, however, the latter began as the starter but, after some costly mistakes, the former was reinstated.

Late during the season, despite having a contract running until 30 June 2009, Goitia refused to play against his future club Real Betis fearing that he would be criticised if he allowed goals (as his future team was fighting to avoid relegation). The four-year deal was officialized in early June 2009, and he featured in 25 matches in his second year as they returned to the top division as champions.

After three more seasons in division two, with CD Mirandés and Deportivo Alavés, Goitia retired at the age of 33 to dedicate himself to his family.

Honours
Betis
Segunda División: 2010–11

References

External links

1982 births
Living people
Spanish footballers
Footballers from Barakaldo
Association football goalkeepers
La Liga players
Segunda División players
Segunda División B players
Danok Bat CF players
SD Amorebieta footballers
Amurrio Club footballers
Burgos CF footballers
Atlético Malagueño players
Málaga CF players
Real Betis players
CD Mirandés footballers
Deportivo Alavés players
Asti Leku Ikastola alumni